Fruitland is an unincorporated community in Stevens County, Washington, United States. Fruitland has a post office with ZIP code 99129.

First settled in 1880 by A.L. Washburn and Price, it received its name from the presence of apple orchards. According to the last census, the population of Fruitland is 812 people.

Notable residents
Donnie and Joe Emerson, brother rock music duo.

References

Unincorporated communities in Stevens County, Washington
Unincorporated communities in Washington (state)
Populated places established in 1880
1880 establishments in Washington Territory